The Duchy of Płock was a feudal district duchy in Masovia, centered on the Płock Land. Its capital was Płock. It existed in the High Middle Ages era, from 1275 to 1294, from 1310 to 1351, and from 1381 to 1462.

History 
The country was established in 1275, in the partition of the Duchy of Masovia, with duke Bolesław II of Masovia becoming its ruler. After his death, the duchy was unified with the Duchy of Czersk, forming the Duchy of Masovia, on 24 June 1294. The state was again reestablished in 1310, in the partition of Duchy of Masovia. In 1351, it was partitioned between the Kingdom of Poland, Duchy of Czersk, and Duchy of Warsaw. It was again reestablished in June 1381, in the partition of the Duchy of Masovia, with duke Siemowit IV as its first leader. It existed until 1462, when it got partitioned between the Kingdom of Poland, and the Duchy of Warsaw.

Citations

Notes

References

Bibliography 
Agnieszka Teterycz-Puzio, Bolesław II Mazowiecki
Janusz Grabowski, Dynastia Piastów Mazowieckich
Anna Suprunik, Mazowsze Siemowitów
J. Krzyżaniakowa, J. Ochmański, Władysław II Jagiełło
 O. Balzer, Genealogia Piastów, Kraków. 1895.
 Jerzy Wyrozumski, Dzieje Polski piastowskiej (VIII w.-1370). Kraków, „Fogra”. 1999. ISBN 83-85719-38-5, OCLC 749221743.

Former countries in Europe
Former monarchies of Europe
Duchies of Poland
Fiefdoms of Poland
Duchy of Plock
Duchy of Plock
Duchy of Plock
13th-century establishments in Poland
13th-century disestablishments in Poland
14th-century establishments in Poland
14th-century disestablishments in Poland
15th-century disestablishments in Poland
States and territories established in 1275
States and territories disestablished in 1294
States and territories established in 1310
States and territories disestablished in 1351
States and territories established in 1381
States and territories disestablished in 1462
Former duchies